Panch Pargana Kishan College, also known as P.P.K. College, established in 1978, is a general degree college in Bundu, Jharkhand. It offers undergraduate courses in arts, commerce and sciences. It is affiliated to  Ranchi University.

Accreditation
P.P.K. College was accredited by the National Assessment and Accreditation Council (NAAC).

See also
Education in India
Ranchi University
Ranchi
Literacy in India
List of institutions of higher education in Jharkhand

References

External links
http://ppkcollegebundu.in/

Colleges affiliated to Ranchi University
Educational institutions established in 1978
Universities and colleges in Jharkhand
1978 establishments in Bihar